"Rafstraumur" (Icelandic for "Electric Current") is a song written by Jón Þór Birgisson, Orri Páll Dýrason, Georg Hólm of Icelandic post rock band Sigur Rós. The song was originally recorded throughout 2012 and 2013 at the Sundlaugin Studio in Mosfellsbær, Iceland for inclusion on the band's seventh studio album, Kveikur. The record appears as the seventh track on the album. The record was released to radio on November 18, 2013 as a promotional single for Kveikur.

Sigur Rós' recording of "Rafstraumur" was remixed by Canadian electronic musician Cyril Hahn, and was released as a single on October 21, 2013. A music video to promote the single was also produced and created.

Track listing

Personnel
Adapted from Kveikur liner notes.

Sigur Rós
Jón Þór Birgisson – vocals, guitar
Georg Hólm – bass
Orri Páll Dýrason – drums

Additional musicians
Eiríkur Orri Ólafsson – brass arrangement
Daníel Bjarnason – string arrangement
Sigrún Jónsdóttir – brass
Eiríkur Orri Ólafsson – brass
Bergrún Snæbjörnsdóttir – brass
Borgar Magnason – strings
Margrét Árnadóttir – strings
Pálína Árnadóttir – strings
Una Sveinbjarnardóttir – strings
Þórunn Ósk Marinósdóttir – strings

Additional personnel
Ted Jensen – mastering
Rich Costey – mixing
Alex Somers – mixing, recording
Elisabeth Carlsson – assistant mixing
Eric Isip – assistant mixing
Chris Kasych – assistant mixing 
Laura Sisk – assistant mixing
Birgir Jón Birgisson – recording
Valgeir Sigurdsson – recording (strings)

Release history

Commercial

Promotional

References

Sigur Rós songs
2013 singles
2013 songs
XL Recordings singles
Songs written by Jónsi
Songs written by Orri Páll Dýrason
Songs written by Georg Hólm
Icelandic-language songs